Sarah Catharine Paulson (born December 17, 1974) is an American actress. She began her acting career in New York City stage productions before starring in the short-lived television series American Gothic (1995–1996) and Jack & Jill (1999–2001). She later appeared in comedy films such as What Women Want (2000) and Down with Love (2003) and drama films such as Path to War (2002) and The Notorious Bettie Page (2005). From 2006 to 2007, she starred as Harriet Hayes in the NBC comedy-drama series Studio 60 on the Sunset Strip, for which she received her first Golden Globe Award nomination. In 2008, she starred as Ellen Dolan in the superhero noir film The Spirit.

Paulson has appeared on Broadway in the plays The Glass Menagerie in 2005 and Collected Stories in 2010. She also starred in a number of independent films and had a leading role in the ABC comedy series Cupid (2009). She later starred in the independent drama film Martha Marcy May Marlene (2011) and received Primetime Emmy Award and Golden Globe Award nominations for her portrayal of Nicolle Wallace in the HBO film Game Change (2012). She was featured as Mary Epps in the 2013 historical drama film 12 Years a Slave, as Abby Gerhard in the 2015 romantic drama film Carol, and as Toni Bradlee in the 2017 political drama film The Post, all of which were nominated for multiple Academy Awards. Her other films include Serenity (2005), New Year's Eve (2011), Mud (2012), Blue Jay (2016), Ocean's 8 (2018), Bird Box (2018), Glass (2019), and Run (2020).

In 2011, Paulson began starring in the FX anthology series American Horror Story, playing different characters in many of the show's 10 seasons. For her performances in the series, she received five Primetime Emmy Award nominations and won two Critics' Choice Television Awards. In 2016, she portrayed real-life prosecutor Marcia Clark in the first season of the anthology series American Crime Story, subtitled The People v. O. J. Simpson, for which she garnered critical acclaim and numerous accolades, including the Primetime Emmy Award and the Golden Globe Award. In 2020, Paulson appeared in the FX limited series Mrs. America, and began starring as Nurse Mildred Ratched in the Netflix psychological thriller series Ratched. In 2021, she returned to American Crime Story to portray Linda Tripp in the third season of the show, subtitled Impeachment. She is the recipient of several accolades, including a Primetime Emmy Award and a Golden Globe Award. In 2017, Time magazine named her one of the 100 most influential people in the world.

Early life
Sarah Catharine Paulson was born in Tampa, Florida, on December 17, 1974, the daughter of Catharine Gordon (née Dolcater) and Douglas Lyle Paulson II. She spent her early life in South Tampa until her parents' divorce when she was five. After her parents' separation, she relocated with her mother and sister to Maine, then to New York City. Her mother worked as a waitress, and Paulson lived in Queens and Gramercy Park before settling in Park Slope. She recalled of this period, "My mom was 27 years old [when we moved]. She didn't know a single person in New York City. She got a job at Sardi's Restaurant. Throughout her childhood, Paulson spent her summers with her father in Florida, who was an executive at a Tampa door manufacturing company. She attended P.S. 29 and Berkeley Carroll School in Brooklyn before attending Manhattan's Fiorello H. LaGuardia High School and the American Academy of Dramatic Arts.

Career

1994–2007

Paulson began working as an actress right out of high school. She appeared in the Horton Foote play Talking Pictures at the Signature Theatre, and in an episode of Law & Order in 1994. The next year, Paulson appeared in the Hallmark television film Friends at Last (1995) opposite Kathleen Turner, playing the adult version of Turner's character's daughter. She also starred in the short-lived television series American Gothic (also 1995), playing the ghost of a murdered woman.

In 1997, Paulson made her feature film debut in the independent thriller film Levitation, playing a woman who discovers she is pregnant after an anonymous sexual encounter. Leonard Klady of Variety noted that Paulson and her co-stars are "not supported by the script", concluding: "Levitation is a grim, convoluted saga of identity and belonging. An ill-fitting combination of melodrama and magic realism, the indie effort will have a decidedly difficult time in the theatrical arena." 
In 1997, Paulson was a featured actress (Janice/Nina) in the two-part episode "True Romance" of Cracker, which starred Robert Pastorelli.
She also appeared Off-Broadway in a fall 1998 production of Killer Joe. She subsequently played Elisa Cronkite in The WB comedy-drama series Jack & Jill (1999). The same year, she was also cast opposite Juliette Lewis and Diane Keaton in the drama The Other Sister, playing the lesbian sister of a developmentally-disabled woman in San Francisco, and in a supporting part playing a hostage in the comedy Held Up, opposite Jamie Foxx. The following year, she had a small supporting role in the comedy What Women Want, starring Mel Gibson and Helen Hunt.

Paulson had a minor recurring role in the HBO series Deadwood (2005–2006), and was a focal character in an episode of the FX series Nip/Tuck. She starred as the main character in the NBC series Leap of Faith. She was then cast in the period comedy Down with Love (2003) in a central role, portraying the friend and editor of a writer (portrayed by Renee Zellweger).

In 2004, she had a supporting role in the ABC series The D.A., which was cancelled after only four episodes. In the spring of 2005, Paulson starred in a revival of The Glass Menagerie on Broadway, opposite future American Horror Story co-star Jessica Lange. Ben Brantley of The New York Times deemed the production as "misdirected and miscast... reality never makes an appearance in this surreally blurred production." Later that year, Paulson appeared Off-Broadway in a production of Colder Than Here, opposite Lily Rabe (also her future co-star on American Horror Story). The production received an unfavorable review from Variety, with critic Dave Rooney writing: "Rabe speaks in an affected monotone while Sarah Paulson has the measured, upward-inflected delivery of a children's TV presenter... this mannered, melancholy play elicits a mainly impassive response, which is no small obstruction in a work dealing with loss."

Also in 2005, Paulson had a small role in the Joss Whedon-directed science fiction film Serenity. In the 2006–07 television season, Paulson co-starred in NBC's Studio 60 on the Sunset Strip, playing Harriet Hayes, one of the stars of the show-within-a-show. This role earned her a nomination for Golden Globe Award for Best Supporting Actress – Series, Miniseries or Television Film. In December 2008, Paulson appeared in the screen adaptation of Will Eisner's comic book The Spirit, playing an updated version of the character Ellen Dolan.

2008–2015

In 2008, ABC cast Paulson in the pilot Cupid, which was ordered to series. It was a remake of the 1998 series starring Jeremy Piven and Paula Marshall. In the new version, Paulson starred opposite Bobby Cannavale. It debuted in late March 2009 on ABC but was cancelled on May 19, 2009, after six episodes. In February 2010, Paulson was cast as the circa 1982 mother of main character Meredith Grey, on the ABC drama Grey's Anatomy, appearing in a flashback sequence in a season-six episode. She then played Nicolle Wallace in the HBO film Game Change (2012), based on events of the 2008 U.S. presidential election campaign. For her performance, she earned Primetime Emmy Award and Golden Globe Award nominations.

In the spring of 2010, she starred in Donald Margulies's Collected Stories alongside Linda Lavin on Broadway. The same year, Paulson filmed the independent drama Martha Marcy May Marlene, in which she starred opposite Elizabeth Olsen and Hugh Dancy, portraying the wealthy sister of a woman who has escaped a cult. The film was released in the fall of 2011. Simultaneously, Paulson guest-starred in three episodes of the FX anthology series American Horror Story, playing medium Billie Dean Howard. Paulson returned the following year for season two, American Horror Story: Asylum, in which she played a new character, Lana Winters, a writer who is committed to an asylum for being a lesbian. During this time, she also played the supporting role of Mary Lee in the acclaimed 2012 drama film Mud, starring Matthew McConaughey.

Paulson returned to theater in March 2013, appearing in an Off-Broadway production of Talley's Folly opposite Danny Burstein. She then starred in the third season of American Horror Story, titled Coven (2013) as Cordelia Foxx, a witch who runs an academy for other young witches. The same year, she starred as Mary Epps, an abusive slave-owner, in the historical drama film 12 Years a Slave. The film was a critical success, earning numerous accolades.

In 2014, Paulson appeared in the fourth season of series of American Horror Story, titled Freak Show, playing the roles of conjoined twin sisters Bette and Dot Tattler, who are members of a circus freak show. She returned for the fifth season, subtitled Hotel, in the role of Hypodermic Sally, the ghost of a drug addict trapped in a Hollywood hotel. She also reprised the character of Billie Dean Howard in the last episode of the season, making a crossover appearance. During this time, Paulson also took on the role of Abby Gerhard in the Todd Haynes-directed romantic drama Carol (2015), a period piece in which she played the supporting role of Cate Blanchett's close friend.

2016–present

Beginning in February 2016, Paulson starred in the first season of the true crime anthology series American Crime Story, subtitled The People v. O.J. Simpson, portraying prosecutor Marcia Clark. She garnered widespread critical acclaim for her performance and won various awards, including the TCA Award for Individual Achievement in Drama, the Primetime Emmy Award for Outstanding Lead Actress in a Limited Series or Movie, and the Golden Globe Award for Best Actress – Miniseries or Television Film.

In June 2016, the Human Rights Campaign released a video in tribute to the victims of the Orlando nightclub shooting; in the video, Paulson and others told the stories of the people killed there. In the fall of 2016, she starred in the sixth iteration of American Horror Story, subtitled Roanoke; in it, she was cast in the dual roles of British actress Audrey Tindall and tortured wife and yoga instructor Shelby Miller, the latter of whom is portrayed by Tindall's character in My Roanoke Nightmare, a documentary within the series. She also reprised her role of Lana Winters in the final episode of Roanoke, in which the character makes a crossover appearance.

After completing Roanoke, Paulson appeared in the series' seventh season, Cult (2017), in which she played restaurant owner Ally Mayfair-Richards, as well as Susan Atkins in the 10th episode of the season.
She also starred as Geraldine Page in one episode of the first season of drama anthology series Feud (2017), which chronicles the turbulent working relationship between actresses Bette Davis and Joan Crawford. Paulson was then cast in the heist film Ocean's 8 (2018), co-starring with Cate Blanchett, Sandra Bullock, Anne Hathaway, Mindy Kaling, Awkwafina, and Rihanna. The film was a commercial success, grossing nearly $300million at the worldwide box office. In 2017, she was invited to join the Academy of Motion Picture Arts and Sciences.

Paulson returned for the eighth season of American Horror Story, titled Apocalypse, which premiered on September 12, 2018. In Apocalypse, Paulson reprised both the Murder House and Coven roles of Billie Dean Howard and Cordelia Foxx, respectively, and also starred as the villainous Miss Wilhemina Venable. In addition to appearing as three characters, Paulson also directed one of the season's episodes, marking her directorial debut. She played Sandra Bullock's character's sister, Jessica, in the drama horror film Bird Box, which was released on Netflix in December 2018.

In 2019, Paulson starred as Dr. Ellie Staple in the superhero thriller film Glass, Xandra in the drama film The Goldfinch, and Dr. Zara in the animated adventure film Abominable. Paulson then starred as Alice Macray in the FX limited drama series Mrs. America, which premiered in April 2020. She also starred as Clarissa Montgomery in the HBO satirical comedy television film Coastal Elites, which premiered in September 2020. In September 2017, it was announced that Paulson would star as a younger version of Nurse Mildred Ratched, the villain of the novel One Flew Over the Cuckoo's Nest and its acclaimed 1975 film adaptation, in the Netflix drama series Ratched, a prequel to the novel which would portray the character's origins. The first season was released on September 18, 2020.

In November 2020, Paulson starred in the thriller film Run, opposite Kiera Allen. It went on to become the most watched original film on streaming platform Hulu.

In 2021, she portrayed Linda Tripp in the third season of the true crime anthology series American Crime Story, subtitled Impeachment. In 2021, she returned to American Horror Story for its tenth season, after being absent for the ninth season.

In February 2022, it was announced that Paulson had been tapped to portray author Glennon Doyle in a TV series based on Doyle's memoir, Untamed.

In the media
In 2017, Time magazine named Paulson one of the 100 most influential people in the world.

In 2018, Paulson was ranked one of the best dressed women by fashion website Net-a-Porter.

Personal life
Paulson lives in Los Angeles. She is a supporter of the Democratic Party. She was diagnosed with melanoma on her back when she was 25, though the growth was removed before the cancer could spread.

Addressing her sexuality, Paulson called it "a fluid situation" and later said, "If my life choices had to be predicated based on what was expected of me from a community on either side, that's going to make me feel really straitjacketed, and I don't want to feel that." She dated actress Cherry Jones from 2004 to 2009. She had dated only men before this relationship, including her former fiancé, playwright Tracy Letts. Since early 2015, she has been in a relationship with actress Holland Taylor.

Filmography

Paulson appeared in such films as What Women Want (2000), Down with Love (2003), Serenity (2005), The Notorious Bettie Page (2005), The Spirit (2008), Martha Marcy May Marlene (2011), New Year's Eve (2011), Mud (2012), Game Change (2012), 12 Years a Slave (2013), Carol (2015), Blue Jay (2016), The Post (2017), Ocean's 8 (2018), Bird Box (2018), Glass (2019), Abominable (2019), and Run (2020).

On television, Paulson starred in American Gothic (1995–1996), Jack & Jill (1999–2001), Deadwood (2006), Studio 60 on the Sunset Strip (2006–2007), Cupid (2009), American Horror Story (2011–present), American Crime Story (2016–present), Mrs. America (2020), and Ratched (2020–present).

Paulson has also appeared on Broadway in the plays The Glass Menagerie (2005) and Collected Stories (2010), and the off-Broadway plays Crimes of the Heart (2008) and Talley's Folly (2013).

Awards and nominations

Paulson has accumulated nominations for seven Primetime Emmy Awards, five Golden Globe Awards, and two Screen Actors Guild Awards, receiving one of each for her role in the limited series The People v. O. J. Simpson: American Crime Story. She was also nominated for her work on other television programs, such as the comedy-drama series Studio 60 on the Sunset Strip, the political drama film Game Change, and the horror anthology series American Horror Story. For her performance in the Academy Award-winning period drama film 12 Years a Slave, she was nominated for the Screen Actors Guild Award for Outstanding Performance by a Cast in a Motion Picture.

References
Notes

Bibliography

External links

 
 
 
 
 
 

1974 births
Living people
20th-century American actresses
21st-century American actresses
Actresses from Maine
Actresses from New York City
Actresses from Tampa, Florida
American Academy of Dramatic Arts alumni
American film actresses
American stage actresses
American television actresses
American voice actresses
Best Miniseries or Television Movie Actress Golden Globe winners
Outstanding Performance by a Female Actor in a Miniseries or Television Movie Screen Actors Guild Award winners
Outstanding Performance by a Lead Actress in a Miniseries or Movie Primetime Emmy Award winners
Fiorello H. LaGuardia High School alumni
LGBT actresses
American LGBT actors
LGBT people from Florida
LGBT people from New York (state)
People from Park Slope
People from Gramercy Park
People from Queens, New York
Florida Democrats
New York (state) Democrats
California Democrats
Maine Democrats